"Optimistic" is a song written by Aubrey Freeman. In 1961, Skeeter Davis recorded and released the song as a single for RCA Victor.

"Optimistic" was recorded on June 29, 1961 at the RCA Victor Studio in Nashville, Tennessee, United States. The song was released as a single in September 1961 also, and it peaked at number ten on the Billboard Magazine Hot C&W Sides chart later that year. The single became Davis' fourth top-ten hit on the country chart at that point. The song was not originally issued onto an official album.

Chart performance

References 

1961 songs
Skeeter Davis songs
Song recordings produced by Chet Atkins
RCA Victor singles
1961 singles